Fifty Starbases is a 1981 role-playing game supplement for Traveller published by Judges Guild.

Contents
Fifty Starbases is a book that provides charts, tables and descriptions to flesh out landing spots on worlds in the Traveller universe.

Publication history
Fifty Starbases was published in 1981 by Judges Guild as a 96-page book.

Reception
William A. Barton reviewed Fifty Starbases in The Space Gamer No. 43. Barton commented that "I'm afraid I must give Fifty Starbases a qualified recommendation. The information section on starports is quite useful, as will be some of the maps, if you don't mind paying [the price] for the package and being able to use less than half the book, pick up a copy."

References

Judges Guild publications
Role-playing game supplements introduced in 1981
Traveller (role-playing game) supplements